Blag, Steal & Borrow may refer to:

 Blag, Steal & Borrow (album), an album by Koopa
 "Blag, Steal & Borrow" (song), an album by Koopa